Erinnyis yucatana is a moth of the family Sphingidae first described by Herbert Druce in 1888. It is found from Mexico and Belize south to at least Costa Rica.

The wingspan is 92–96 mm. Adults are probably on wing year round.

References

Erinnyis
Moths described in 1888